Domatha is a genus of crab spiders that was first described by Eugène Louis Simon in 1895.  it contains two species, found in the Philippines and Papua New Guinea: D. celeris and D. vivida.

See also
 List of Thomisidae species

References

Further reading

Araneomorphae genera
Spiders of Asia
Thomisidae